University Academy Charter High School (often abbreviated to UACHS) is a four-year comprehensive public charter high school that serves students in ninth through twelfth grades from Jersey City, in Hudson County, New Jersey, United States. The school opened in the 2002–03 school year and operates under the terms of a charter granted by the New Jersey Department of Education in 2001. Through its affiliation with New Jersey City University, students who graduate from the school with a grade point average of 3.8 or higher are eligible to receive a four-year scholarship to NJCU.

As of the 2021–22 school year, the school had an enrollment of 441 students and 35.0 classroom teachers (on an FTE basis), for a student–teacher ratio of 12.6:1. There were 252 students (57.1% of enrollment) eligible for free lunch and 29 (6.6% of students) eligible for reduced-cost lunch.

Awards, recognition and rankings
The school was the 283rd-ranked public high school in New Jersey out of 339 schools statewide in New Jersey Monthly magazine's September 2014 cover story on the state's "Top Public High Schools".

Based on the 2018–2019 school year, UACHS was ranked 331th in NJ out of 424 schools according to US News. The AP® participation rate at the school is 34%.

Clubs
The extracurricular activities offered at UACHS include Anime Club, Art Club, Chess Club, Choir, Debate, Drama Club, Freshmen-Senior Class Committees, Interact Club, Journalism, National Honor Society, Poetry Club, Student Government, The Student Voice Newspaper, UMOJA, and Yearbook.

Athletics
The University Academy Charter Generals compete in the Hudson County Interscholastic League, which consists of public and private high schools in Hudson County and operates under the auspices of the New Jersey State Interscholastic Athletic Association (NJSIAA). With 313 students in grades 10-12, the school was classified by the NJSIAA for the 2019–20 school year as Group I for most athletic competition purposes, which included schools with an enrollment of 75 to 476 students in that grade range.

Sports offered by the school include baseball, boys' and girls' basketball, fall cross country track, softball, spring track and winter indoor track.

Administration
Core members of the school's administration include:
Erie Lugo Jr., Dean / Principal
Michele Bruce, Assistant Dean/Vice Principal
Sean Sawyer, Assistant Dean/Vice Principal

References

External links 
University Academy Charter High School

Data for University Academy Charter High School, National Center for Education Statistics

2002 establishments in New Jersey
Charter schools in New Jersey
Educational institutions established in 2002
High schools in Jersey City, New Jersey
Public high schools in Hudson County, New Jersey